Naser Kiadeh-ye Mian Mahalleh (also Romanized as Nāşer Kīādeh-ye Mīān Maḩalleh; also known as Mīān Maḩalleh-ye Nāşer Kīādeh) is a village in Shirju Posht Rural District, Rudboneh District, Lahijan County, Gilan Province, Iran. At the 2006 census, its population was 226, in 68 families.

References 

Populated places in Lahijan County